Within the guidelines of halacha, as presented by chazal and early rabbinic authorities, fellatio is classified as ביאה דרך איברים (penetration by way of the limbs) or מעשה חידודים בעלמא (general acts of sharpening).

Peripheral halachic discussion of the topic revolves upon whether or not a husband may engage in varying sexually-gratifying acts with his wife – including fellatio – performed up to ejaculation. The opinions below use the term biyah sheloh kedarka in their original Hebrew text, which refers to anal sex, not any form of extra-vaginal ejaculation. This distinction is very important, as these same authorities do in fact prohibit ejaculation through other forms of extra-vaginal sex, such as oral sex, etc. Oral sex, up until ejaculation, is entirely permitted according to most Talmudic and halachic authorities. Ejaculation should take place within the vagina.

The discussion includes the opinion of the permitting authorities limiting their permit to specific frequencies and timings, the consensus being that any halachic-permit ("hetter") is solely applicable within the exclusive framework of a Torah-permitted marital relationship and strictly during the time that one's wife is not in her niddah state.

Maimonides
In the original Hebrew text of the Mishneh Torah of Maimonides, he takes a lenient approach that permits all that a man desires to do with his wife. The presentation omits the customary prohibition on extracting semen in vain, which HaRav Yossef Qafih quarantines as an addition by a subsequent unknown editor. Maimonides' commentary to the Mishnah likewise hints at a lenient stance.

On occasion 
Chazal have in certain instances permitted intentional extra-vaginal ejaculation in tandem with one's wife. Tosefot cites the opinion of Rabbi Yitzchak (Isaac ben Samuel) who permits an occasional complete anal ejaculation with one's wife on condition that one does not accustom himself to always doing so (Tosfoth, Yebamoth 34b; Tosfoth, Sanhedrin 58b). The Bayit Chadash (Yoel Sirkis) commentary to the Rabbeinu Asher (ibid.) explicitly permits this foreign ejaculation with Rabbeinu Asher siding with the Tosafist opinion. This opinion is likewise quoted in Tur Shulchan Aruch, Even Ha'ezer ch. 25.

The Bayis Chodosh sourced his views based on the Talmudic tract of Yebamoth;

Thus Rabbenu Asher, followed by Rabbi Elijah Spira, commented that an occasional anal ejaculation in tandem with one's wife is not considered "extracting semen in vain" (and not banned by the Talmud) as long as the intention is not to avoid impregnating one's wife and it is done on occasion, as this is not likened to the desire of Onan who wished to avoid impregnating Tamar entirely. The Aguddah work also sides with the lenient opinion permitting an occasional extra-vaginal ejaculation with one's wife, whilst Rabbi Samuel Eidels (the Maharsha) likewise taking a lenient view.

Parable of meat and fish
In a varying text of Kallah Rabthi as printed by Rabbi Solomon Aaron Wertheimer in "Battei Medrashoth", Rabbi Werthheimer notes the significance of the Talmud quoting both meat and fish in its parable depicting the enhanced permissiveness of sexually gratifying activities that one may perform with his wife.

Since the Torah forbids cooking one's meat in milk, a parable quoting just meat would not suffice as meat has this restrictive element whereas fish has a lesser restrictive element, thus implying that man has an enhanced level of (sexual) freedom with his wife.

As often as needed
A more explicit permissive stance is that of the tosafist rabbi Isaiah di Trani the Elder who hints that a complete extra-vaginal ejaculation is permitted whenever needed to "seat" one's desire with the stark exclusion being to avoid pregnancy;

Rabbi Isaiah the Elder's view is likewise echoed by his descendant, Rabbi Isaiah di Trani the Younger.

Rabbi Eleazar of Worms, in his recently published Torah commentary to the verse "Adam and his wife, and where not embarrassed" (Genesis) permits any activity with one's wife necessary to "quiet (lit. seat)" his desire.

Active participation
Later rabbinic authorities differentiated between masturbation (self-extracting semen in vain) and an extra-vaginal ejaculation achieved with the active participation of one's Torah-permitted partner—with the former being forbidden under most if not all circumstances. Apparently, any halachic permit for an extra-vaginal ejaculation must be accompanied by the active participation of one's wife.

From among rabbis of the Acharonim, the Tzemach Tzedek differentiated between extracting one's seed alone ("masturbation upon trees and stones") and extra-vaginal extracting of one's semen with the active participation of one's wife, with the latter classified as a form of a tandem relationship.

See also
 Cunnilingus in Halacha
 Fellatio in Islam
 Judaism and masturbation
 Oral sex
 Oral suction

Further reading
 Rabbi, My Husband Wants a Blowjob; A Halachic Analysis of Fellatio, S. Even-Shoshan

References 

Fellatio
Jewish marital law
Judaism and sexuality
Judaism and society
Judaism and women